South Dorset is a constituency represented in the House of Commons of the UK Parliament since 2010 by Richard Drax, a Conservative. The constituency was created as a consequence of the Redistribution of Seats Act 1885, although the area covered has changed since then.

History

Formation
The constituency was created as a consequence of the Redistribution of Seats Act 1885. The Act reduced the number of MPs.in Dorset from 10 to 4 (see Redistribution of Seats Act 1885#Redistributed seats: England). It was initially proposed to name the new constituencies after existing boroughs (Shaftesbury, Dorchester, Poole and Bridport) but, following an amendment in the Commons on 14 April 1885, the names were changed to the points of the compass (North Dorset, South Dorset, East Dorset, West Dorset).

The South Dorset constituency was divided into 7 polling districts. Dorchester was chosen as the place where the nomination of candidates would take place and the result would be declared. The area covered was:

Broadwey polling district: Bincombe, Broadwey, Buckland Ripers, Preston and Sutton Poyntz, Upwey
Chesilton polling district: Portland
Dorchester polling district: Bockhampton-cum-Stinsford, Bradford Peverell and Muckleford, Charminster, Dorchester All Saints, Dorchester Holy Trinity, Dorchester St Peter, Fordington, Stratton and Grimstone, West Knighton, West Stafford, Whitcombe, Winterborne Came, Winterborne Herringstone, Winterborne Monkton, Winterborne St Martin
Melcombe Regis polling district: Chickerell, Fleet, Melcombe Regis, Radipole, Weymouth, Wyke Regis
Poxwell polling district:  Broadmayne, Osmington, Poxwell, Warmwell, Watercombe
Puddletown polling district: Affpuddle, Athelhampton, Burleston, Dewlish, Piddlehinton, Puddletown, Tincleton, Tolpuddle, Turners Puddle, Woodsford
Winfrith polling district: Chaldon Herring, Coombe Keynes, East Lulworth, Moreton, Owermoigne, West Lulworth, Winfrith Newburgh, Wool

Recent history
In the 1997 election the seat was won by Ian Bruce by a margin of only 77 votes, one of the smallest margins in the UK. The 2001 election saw the second Labour win in South Dorset's history with Labour's smallest majority in England, at 153. In the 2005 election this constituency was one of the few in which Labour significantly increased their majority. Conservative candidate Ed Matts was found to have doctored an image which was part of his campaign material. Matts changed a photo of a protest against the deportation of a South Dorset resident, so that it appeared to be a protest against "uncontrolled immigration". In both elections, the left-wing singer-songwriter Billy Bragg led an anti-Conservative tactical voting campaign in Dorset constituencies. 

The 2010 election saw Conservative Richard Drax, a former soldier and journalist from a long line of Dorset representatives, defeating the incumbent Jim Knight, who ended his final year in parliament as the Minister (of State) for Employment and Welfare Reform. Richard Drax retained the seat in 2015 election with an increased majority.

Boundaries

1885–1918: The Municipal Boroughs of Dorchester, and Weymouth and Melcombe Regis, and parts of the Sessional Divisions of Dorchester and Wareham.

1918–1950: The Municipal Boroughs of Wareham, and Weymouth and Melcombe Regis, the Urban Districts of Portland and Swanage, the Rural District of Wareham and Purbeck, and the part of the Rural District of Weymouth that was not included in the Dorset West constituency (i.e. Bincombe, Broadwey, Chickerell, Fleet, Osmington, Owermoigne, Poxwell, Preston, Radipole, Upwey and Wyke Regis).

1950–1983: The Municipal Boroughs of Wareham, and Weymouth and Melcombe Regis, the Urban Districts of Portland and Swanage, the Rural District of Wareham and Purbeck, and in the Rural District of Dorchester the civil parishes of Bincombe, Chickerell, Fleet, Osmington, Owermoigne, and Poxwell.

1983–1997: The Borough of Weymouth and Portland, the District of Purbeck wards of Bere Regis, Castle, Langton, St Martin, Swanage North, Swanage South, Wareham, West Purbeck, Winfrith, and Wool, and the District of West Dorset ward of Owermoigne.

1997–2010: The Borough of Weymouth and Portland, the District of Purbeck wards of Castle, Langton, Swanage North, Swanage South, West Purbeck, Winfrith, and Wool, and the District of West Dorset ward of Owermoigne.

2010–present: The Borough of Weymouth and Portland, the District of Purbeck wards of Castle, Creech Barrow, Langton, Swanage North, Swanage South, West Purbeck, Winfrith, and Wool, and the District of West Dorset ward of Owermoigne.

Constituency profile

The seat includes the coastal areas to the south of the county of Dorset, plus some rural Purbeck territory further inland. The port of Weymouth is one of the few large towns in Dorset and its suburbs extend onto the Wyke Regis peninsula and the isle of Portland, connected to the mainland by road (and, in the past, rail).

The constituency includes Bovington army camp, and further east, Corfe Castle, connected by the preserved Swanage Railway steam railway to the holiday resort of Swanage.  This part of the seat is closer to Poole and Bournemouth than to Weymouth.

Workless claimants were in November 2012 significantly lower than the national average of 3.8%, at 2.8% of the population based on a statistical compilation by The Guardian.

Members of Parliament

Elections

Elections in the 2010s

Elections in the 2000s

Elections in the 1990s

Elections in the 1980s

Elections in the 1970s

Elections in the 1960s

Elections in the 1950s

Elections in the 1940s

General Election 1939–40:

Another general election was required to take place before the end of 1940. The political parties had been making preparations for an election to take place from 1939 and by the end of this year, the following candidates had been selected; 
Conservative: Robert Gascoyne-Cecil
Liberal: Frederick William King
Labour: Philip Sidney Eastman

Elections in the 1930s

Elections in the 1920s

Elections in the 1910s

Elections in the 1900s

Elections in the 1890s

Elections in the 1880s

See also
 List of parliamentary constituencies in Dorset

Notes

References

Sources
BBC News article on the 2001 South Dorset election

Constituencies of the Parliament of the United Kingdom established in 1885
Parliamentary constituencies in Dorset
History of Weymouth, Dorset